The  Chicago Bears season was their 44th regular season and 12th post-season appearance in the National Football League. The team finished with an  record to gain their first Western Conference championship since 1956, and the berth to host the NFL Championship Game against the New York Giants 

In the regular season, Chicago defeated the rival Green Bay Packers (11–2–1) twice to deny them the opportunity to play for a third consecutive NFL title; the Packers had won the previous five meetings with Chicago. In the championship game on December 29, the Bears defeated the Giants, 14–10, at Wrigley Field for the club's eighth league title, their first since 1946 and the last under head coach and founder 

This was the Bears' last playoff berth prior to the AFL–NFL merger, and their last NFL championship until 1985 and Super Bowl XX. The Bears' defense in 1963 was the third in history to lead the NFL in fewest rushing yards, fewest passing yards, and fewest total yards; the defense also allowed only 144 points, formerly an NFL record.

In 2007, ESPN.com ranked the 1963 Bears as the ninth-greatest defense in NFL history, noting, "[i]n 1963, Bears defensive coach George Allen came up with a new zone defense against the pass, befuddling opponents. With Doug Atkins and Ed O'Bradovich pressuring opposing QBs from their defensive end slots, and Bill George and Larry Morris defending against short passes from the linebacker position, the Bears picked off 36 passes, and allowed just 10.3 points and 227 yards per game. The Bears went on to win the NFL championship, thanks to the Defense. In the title game against Y. A. Tittle and the Giants, who had the best offense in the NFL, Chicago's five picks were the key, as the Bears won 14–10. George Allen got the game ball."

Offseason

NFL Draft

Source:

Personnel

Coaches
Head coach – George Halas
Assistants – George Allen (Defensive Coordinator), Jim Dooley, Phil Handler, Luke Johnsos, Sid Luckman, Chuck Mather

Roster

 Team photo
 Rosters - 1963 NFL title game

Regular season

Schedule

Game summaries

Week 1 at Packers

Source:

Week 2 at Vikings

Week 3 at Lions

Week 4 vs Colts

Week 5

    
    
    
    
    
    
    
    
    
    

Mike Ditka 9 Rec, 110 Yds

Week 6

Week 7

Week 8

Week 9

Week 10

Week 11

Week 12

Week 13

Week 14

Standings

NFL Championship

    
    
    
    

The Giants opened the scoring in the first quarter when quarterback Y. A. Tittle led New York on an 83-yard drive that was capped off by a 14-yard touchdown pass to Frank Gifford. The drive was set up by Bears quarterback Bill Wade's fumble deep in Giants territory, which was recovered by former Bear Erich Barnes. However, later in the first period, Tittle suffered an injury to his left knee when Larry Morris hit him during his throwing motion. For the rest of the game, Tittle would never be the same. Morris then intercepted Tittle's screen pass and returned the ball 61 yards to the Giants' 6-yard line. Two plays later, Wade scored a touchdown on a two-yard quarterback sneak to tie the game at 7.

In the second quarter, the Giants retook the lead, 10–7, on a 13-yard field goal. But on New York's next drive, Tittle re-injured his left knee on another hit by Morris. With Tittle out for two possessions, the Giants struggled, only able to advance 2 yards in 7 plays. New York coach Allie Sherman even punted on third down, showing no confidence in backup Glynn Griffing. However, the score remained 10–7 at halftime.

Tittle came back in the third period, but due to his injury, he was forced to throw off his back foot. An interception on a screen pass by the Bears' Ed O'Bradovich was brought deep into Giants territory, setting up Wade's 1-yard touchdown to give Chicago a 14–10 lead. The score held up, and the Bears iced the game on Richie Petitbon's interception in the end zone with 10 seconds left. It was Tittle's 5th interception. At the end of the game, defensive coordinator George Allen was given the game ball due to his defense's spectacular play.

References

Additional sources

 NFL Record and Fact Book

External links
 1963 Chicago Bears season, YouTube.com/

Chicago Bears seasons
Chicago Bears
National Football League championship seasons
Chicago Bears